Tim Briggs may refer to:
 Tim Briggs (politician)
 Tim Briggs (surgeon)